is a Japanese manga series written and illustrated by Hisae Iwaoka. It was serialized in Shogakukan's seinen manga magazine Monthly Ikki from November 2005 to June 2011, with its chapters collected in seven tankōbon volumes. Viz Media licensed the series for English-language publication in North America.

Plot
The story is set in a distant future, where the Earth has been evacuated and humanity now inhabits a man-made ring-shaped city orbiting 35 kilometers above the planet's surface. The ring is divided into floors, of which there are three; the first being the living space of everyday workers, the second being dedicated to agriculture, and the third being the dwellings of the upper class. The plot follows the life of a young man called Mitsu, whose job as a window cleaner allows him a glimpse into the lives of the ring's inhabitants, as he attempts to learn more about his father's disappearance while working in the same job.

Characters

Window Cleaners

Mitsu works as a window cleaner because he takes joy in it and because he wants to learn about his father's ill disappearance at work. He tends to be of a very calm nature, and he is very dedicated to his job, something he is aware of as being a dangerous and low-paying occupation. He is somewhat inexperienced and insecure of himself.

Jin is Mitsu's superior and occasional supervisor who has had plenty more experience working as a window cleaner. He tends to speak gruffly and is externally of a brash nature, however he is caring for his co-workers. He lives with his wife, Haruko and his a close friend of Tamachi (even though they dislike admitting it).

A co-worker of Mitsu who has a grudge with him for "replacing Tamachi" and for "having it so easy" in terms of work.

Other characters

Jin's wife. Haruko is frail and prone to blackouts due to what is described as an autoimmunity deficiency caused by a lack of sunlight in the lower levels. In a flashback it is revealed that she dislikes hospitals due to an accident that led to her sterility. This doesn't stop Haruko from being cheery and from participating in public agriculture.

A family of three that occasionally house Mitsu. The family is integrated by the bald and boisterous Mr. Kageyama, his wife, and their daughter Fuyo.

Tamachi worked as a window cleaner until he had to take up his family's business in the upper levels. He was the former partner of Aki (Mitsu's father). It is revealed that he has a slight feud with Jin. Tamachi frequently hires Jin to clean windows above gardens. He works in a bio-gas plant and lives with his wife.

An acquaintance of Mitsu who works as a "falling objects researcher" . She was originally mistaken as a man by Mitsu. She and her pet cat live outside of the ring on a small cabin, and the exposure to solar radiation gives her constant sunburns.

Publication
Saturn Apartments, written and illustrated by Hisae Iwaoka, was serialized in Shogakukan's seinen manga magazine Monthly Ikki from November 25, 2005, to June 25, 2011. Shogakukan collected its chapters in seven tankōbon volumes, released from October 30, 2006, to August 30, 2011.

The manga was licensed in North America by Viz Media, who released its seven volumes from May 25, 2010, to May 21, 2013. It was also licensed in Taiwan by Taiwan Tohan, and Kana in France.

Volume list
Chapters are called "floors".

Reception

Matthew Warner enjoyed the interesting world presented in the manga, and praised the 'simple, yet gorgeous art style'.  Johanna Draper Carlson compares the protagonist, Mitsu, to Charlie Brown, as they both have rounded heads and small eyes, and are "dealing with a grim life".  Later, she describes Mitsu as being a typical 'plucky young manga hero' who improves at his work, but is also noted for his talking to his upper-class clients. Greg McElhatton compares Iwaoka's artwork to Travis Charest and Sean Chen, praising the details of the work.
YALSA included the first volume of the series on their 2011 Great Graphic Novels for Teens list.

References

External links

2005 manga
Science fiction anime and manga
Seinen manga
Shogakukan manga
Viz Media manga